Upper Sackville may refer to
Upper Sackville, Nova Scotia
Upper Sackville, New Brunswick